The 1943 college football season was the 75th season of intercollegiate football in the United States.  Competition included schools from the Big Ten Conference, the Pacific Coast Conference (PCC), the Southeastern Conference (SEC), the Big Six Conference, the Southwestern Conference, and numerous smaller conferences and independent programs. The season was played during World War II.

The teams ranked highest in the final Associated Press poll in December 1942 were:
 1943 Notre Dame Fighting Irish football team - The Fighting Irish compiled a 9–1 and were ranked No. 1 in the final AP poll. They lost their final game of the season, a Chicago contest against No. 6 Great Lakes Navy.  Along the way, however, the Fighting Irish had played one of the toughest college schedules ever, beating two No. 2 ranked teams (Michigan and Iowa Pre-Flight) and two No. 3 ranked teams (Navy and Army). 
 1943 Iowa Pre-Flight Seahawks football team - In 1943, voting in the AP poll included "service teams" drawn from military flight schools and training centers. Led by head coach Don Faurot, the Seahawks compiled a 9–1 record, outscored opponents  by a total of 277 to 98, and ranked highest among the service teams. They led the nation with 324.4 rushing yards per game.
 1943 Michigan Wolverines football team - Led by head coach Fritz Crisler, the Wolverines compiled an 8–1 record, tied for the Big Ten championship, and outscored opponents by a total of 302 to 73. Their only loss was to No. 1 Notre Dame. The Wolverines led the Big Ten (and ranked fifth nationally) with an average of 363.2 yards per game of total offense. They also led the Big Ten (and ranked 10th nationally) giving up 164.1 yards per game in total defense. Bill Daley rushed for 817 yards and led the nation with an average of 6.81 yards per carry.
 1943 Navy Midshipmen football team - The Midshipmen compiled a 6–0–1 record and outscored opponents by a total of 236 to 88. They ranked eighth nationally in total defense, giving up only 161.2 yards per game.
 1943 Purdue Boilermakers football team - The Boilermakers compiled a 9–0 record, tied with Michigan for the Big Ten championship, and outscored opponents by a total of 214 to 55. Guard Alex Agase was a consensus All-American. Fullback Tony Butkovich led the Big Ten (and ranked third nationally) with 833 rushing yards; he was later killed at the Battle of Okinawa.

Quarterback Angelo Bertelli of Notre Dame won the Heisman Trophy, and halfback Bob O'Dell of Penn won the Maxwell Award. The statistical leaders for 1943 included Robert Hoernschemeyer of Indiana with  1,648 yards of total offense, Creighton Miller of Notre Dame with 911 rushing yards, Paul Rickards of Pittsburgh with 997 passing yards, Marion Flanagan of Texas A&M with 403 receiving yards, and Steve Van Buren of LSU with 98 points scored.

A number of universities suspended their football programs for the 1943 season, including Alabama, Auburn, Boston College, Duquesne, Florida, Fordham, Harvard, Kentucky, Michigan State, Ole Miss, Mississippi State, Oregon State, Stanford, Syracuse, Tennessee, Vanderbilt, Washington State, and William & Mary.

Conference and program changes

September
On September 17, Georgia beat Presbyterian College 25–7.  The next day, September 18, Michigan won at Camp Grant, 26–0.  Wisconsin lost to Marquette, 33–7, on its way to a 1–9–0 finish.

September 25 
Ohio State lost to Iowa Pre-Flight 28–13.  Michigan beat Western Michigan 57–6.  Notre Dame won at Pitt, 42–0.
Army beat Villanova 27–0 and Navy beat North Carolina Pre-Flight, 31–0.  Georgia lost at LSU, 34–27.  Tulsa beat SMU 20–7, Georgia Tech beat North Carolina 20–7.

October
October 2 Michigan won at Northwestern 21–7.  Notre Dame beat Georgia Tech 55–13.  Army defeated Colgate 42–0 and Navy beat Cornell 46–7. The first AP Poll of the season led off with No. 1 Notre Dame, No. 2 Michigan, No. 3 Army, No. 4 Navy, and No. 5 Duke.

October 9 No. 1 Notre Dame beat No. 2 Michigan 35–21 in the first No. 1 vs. No. 2 matchup in the seven-year history of the AP Poll.  No. 3 Army registered another shutout, defeating Temple 51–0.  In Baltimore, No. 4 Navy edged  No. 5 Duke, 14–13.  No. 6 Penn edged No. 14 Dartmouth 7–6.  No. 7 Purdue went to 4–0–0 with a 19–0 win over Camp Grant. The next AP Poll featured No. 1 Notre Dame, No. 2 Army, No. 3 Navy, No. 4 Penn, and No. 5 Purdue.

October 16 No. 1 Notre Dame won at Wisconsin 50–0.  No. 2 Army won at Columbia, 52–0.  In four games, the Cadets had outscored their opponents 172–0.  No. 3 Navy beat Penn State 14–6.  No. 4 Penn beat the Lakehurst Naval Air Station 74–6.  No. 5 Purdue beat Ohio State 30–7 at a game in Cleveland. Penn and Purdue swapped spots in the next AP Poll, but Notre Dame, Army, and Navy remained the top three.

October 23 No. 1 Notre Dame beat Illinois 47–0.  No. 2 Army yielded its first points, but won at Yale, 39–7.  No. 3 Navy beat Georgia Tech 28–14 in Baltimore.  No. 4 Purdue beat Iowa 28–7.  No. 5 Penn won at Columbia, 33–0, but dropped from the Top Five.  No. 7 USC stayed unbeaten, untied, and unscored upon with a 6–0 win over No. 6 Pacific, and the next poll raised the Trojans to No. 5 behind Notre Dame, Army, Navy, and Purdue.

October 30  In Cleveland, No. 1 Notre Dame beat No. 3 Navy, 33–6.  In Philadelphia, No. 2 Army and No. 6 Pennsylvania played to a 13–13 tie.  No. 4 Purdue won at Wisconsin, 32–0.  No. 5 USC beat California, 13–0, for its sixth straight shutout. The next AP Poll featured No. 1 Notre Dame, No. 2 Purdue, No. 3 Army, No. 4 USC, and No. 5 Penn.

November
November 6 At Yankee Stadium in New York, No. 1 Notre Dame beat No. 3 Army, 26–0.  No. 2 Purdue won at Minnesota, 14–7.  No. 4 USC lost at San Diego to the San Diego Navy team.  No. 5 Penn lost to No. 7 Navy, 24–7.  No. 6 Michigan beat Indiana 23–6.  No. 8 Iowa Pre-Flight continued its unbeaten streak with a 46–19 win at Marquette on November 7, and became the first “service team” to ever reach the AP's Top Five, ranking No. 5 behind Notre Dame, Purdue, Navy, and Michigan.

November 13  No. 1 Notre Dame won at Northwestern 25–6.  No. 2 Purdue was idle.  No. 3 Navy won at Columbia 61–0.  No. 4 Michigan beat Wisconsin 27–0.  No. 5 Iowa Pre-Flight beat Camp Grant 28–13. The AP voters elevated Iowa Pre-Flight to No. 2 in the next poll, just in time for a showdown with No. 1 Notre Dame. No. 3 Purdue, No. 4 Michigan, and No. 5 Navy rounded out the Top Five.

November 20  No. 1 Notre Dame edged No. 2 Iowa Pre-Flight, 14–13.  No. 3 Purdue closed its season undefeated (9–0–0) with a 7–0 win at Indiana.  No. 4 Michigan closed its season at 8–1–0 with a 45–7 win over Ohio State.  No. 5 Navy was idle. No. 6 Duke closed its season at 8–1–0 with a 27–6 win over North Carolina and was raised to No. 5 in the next AP Poll behind Notre Dame, Iowa Pre-Flight, Michigan, and Purdue.
 
November 27  No. 1 Notre Dame closed its season with a 19–14 loss to Great Lakes NTC, 19–14, but still finished No. 1 in the final rankings.  Iowa Pre-Flight, which had stayed at No. 2 after its close loss to Notre Dame, beat Minnesota, 32–0, to finish at 9–1–0.  No. 3 Michigan, No. 4 Purdue, and No. 5 Duke had finished their seasons. No. 6 Navy closed its season with a 13–0 win over No. 7 Army in the Army–Navy Game, which took place at West Point. The Midshipmen rose to No. 4 in the final poll, behind Notre Dame, Iowa Pre-Flight, and Michigan. Purdue moved down to No. 5, Great Lakes NTC entered the poll at No. 6 after their upset of Notre Dame, and Duke slipped to No. 7.

Conference standings

Major conference standings

Independents

Minor conferences

Minor conference standings

Rankings

Heisman Trophy voting
The Heisman Trophy is given to the year's most outstanding player

Bowl games

Statistical leaders

Team leaders

Total offense

(*) One game not reported

Total defense

(*) One game not reported

Rushing offense

Scoring
1. Duke - 37.2 points per game
2. Notre Dame - 34.0 points per game
3. Tulsa - 33.6 points points per game
4. Michigan - 33.6 points per game
5. Del Monte Pre-Flight - 31.5 points per game
6. Texas - 30.8 points per game
7. Army - 29.9 points per game
8. March Field - 29.2 points per game
9. Colorado College - 28.4 points per game
10. Richmond - 27.9 points per game
11. Iowa Pre-Flight - 27.7 points per game
12. Penn -  27.6 points per game

Individual leaders

Total offense

Rushing

Passing

See also
 1943 College Football All-America Team
 List of World War II military service football teams

References